Galactica is a genus of moths in the family Galacticidae.

Selected species
Galactica caradjae Walsingham, 1911
Galactica inornata (Walsingham, 1900)
Galactica pluripunctella Caradja, 1920
Galactica variinotella (Chrétien, 1915)
Galactica walsinghami Caradja, 1920

References

Galacticidae